Lionel Royer-Perreaut (born 13 November 1972) is a French politician from En Marche who has been Member of Parliament for Bouches-du-Rhône's 6th constituency in the National Assembly since 2022.

See also 

 List of deputies of the 16th National Assembly of France

References 

Living people
1972 births
People from Toulon
Deputies of the 16th National Assembly of the French Fifth Republic
21st-century French politicians
Members of Parliament for Bouches-du-Rhône
Republican Party (France) politicians
Union for French Democracy politicians
Union for a Popular Movement politicians
The Republicans (France) politicians
La République En Marche! politicians